The Seminole are a Native American people.

Seminole can also refer to:

Places in the United States
Seminole, Alabama, an unincorporated community
Seminole, Florida, a city
Seminole, Oklahoma, a city
Seminole, Texas, a city
Lake Seminole, a reservoir in Alabama, Florida, and Georgia
Seminole County, Florida
Seminole County, Georgia
Seminole County, Oklahoma
Seminole State Forest, Florida
Seminole Manor, Florida

Arts and entertainment
Seminole (band), a country music duo
Seminole (film), a 1953 movie starring Rock Hudson and Anthony Quinn
"Seminole", a 1904 song by Egbert Van Alstyne

Military
, United States Navy ships of the name
L-23 Seminole, a United States Air Force liaison aircraft

Transportation
Seminole (train), a train operated by the Illinois Central Railroad and successors
Piper PA-44 Seminole, a popular twin-engine aircraft

Other uses
Seminole, dialects of the Muscogee language spoken by some Seminole
Florida State University Seminoles, the sports teams representing Florida State University
 The 1956 Seminole nuclear test, part of Operation Redwing